Alderman Sir William Anderson Rose (16 August 1820 – 9 June 1881) was a businessman, MP and Lord Mayor of London.

Rose was educated at St Olave's Grammar School and University College London. He served as a Sheriff of the City of London for 1855 and was elected Lord Mayor of London for 1862. He was elected as Conservative MP for Southampton from 1862 to 1865.

He was appointed Colonel of the Royal London Militia on 16 November 1870, and after retirement was appointed Honorary Colonel of the regiment on 12 June 1880.

References

External links
 
Rose, William Anderson (1820-1881)  at London City History

1820 births
1881 deaths
Conservative Party (UK) MPs for English constituencies
UK MPs 1859–1865
Sheriffs of the City of London
19th-century lord mayors of London
19th-century English politicians
People educated at St Olave's Grammar School
Alumni of University College London